Hualong Station is a station on Loop line of Chongqing Rail Transit in Chongqing municipality, China. It is located in Jiulongpo District and opened in 2021.

There are 2 island platforms at this station, located separately on two floors. On each floor, only one side of the platform is currently in use and the other side is reserved.

References

Railway stations in Chongqing
Railway stations in China opened in 2021
Chongqing Rail Transit stations